Dave Pureifory (July 12, 1949 – March 5, 2009) was a professional American football defensive end and defensive tackle for three teams in an eleven-year career in the National Football League (NFL).

Early life
Pureifory was born in Pensacola, Florida, and grew up in Ecorse, Michigan.  Following his graduation from Ecorse High School in 1968, he attended college at Eastern Michigan University, where he played football. He received first-team honors on the 1970 Little All-America college football team.

Football career
He was drafted in the 6th round of the 1972 NFL Draft by the Green Bay Packers, where he played primarily in a backup role as defensive tackle. While he was known for his play on defense, for two games in 1975 he was called upon to fill-in for injured kicker Chester Marcol.  In four extra point attempts, Pureifory was successful twice;.

The Packers traded Pureifory to the Pittsburgh Steelers for a fifth-round selection in a draft day trade in 1978.  The Steelers subsequent moved him to the New England Patriots for their 1979 sixth-round pick.  The Patriots released him prior to the  season.  He was picked up by the Cincinnati Bengals, but went to the Detroit Lions mid-season as a free agent.  It was in Detroit where he saw his greatest success, starting every game he played there, and winning Detroit's Most Valuable Defensive Player honors in 1980.  While having one of his best seasons in 1982, Pureifory sustained leg injuries that ended his NFL career.  Nonetheless, he later played with the Michigan Panthers and Birmingham Stallions of the United States Football League.

Post-football career
In 1981 Purifory was elected to Eastern Michigan’s Athletic Hall of Fame.  He died March 5, 2009, in Ypsilanti, Michigan, from pancreatic cancer at the age of 59.

Notes and references

1949 births
2009 deaths
American football defensive ends
Eastern Michigan University alumni
Eastern Michigan Eagles football players
Green Bay Packers players
Cincinnati Bengals players
Detroit Lions players
Michigan Panthers players
Birmingham Stallions players
Deaths from prostate cancer
Deaths from cancer in Michigan
Players of American football from Pensacola, Florida